"Blackjack County Chain" is a song written by Red Lane. The song was initially rejected by Charley Pride, who considered at the time the lyrics controversial.

The song was ultimately recorded by Willie Nelson, whose version enjoyed success until it was banned by radio stations. 

Russel Crowe performed a version of the song on the Irish television show the Late Late Show on 9/9/22.

Overview
"Blackjack County Chain" was written by country music artist Red Lane. The song depicts the killing of a Georgia sheriff by members of a chaingang, as recounted by one of them. Lane offered initially the song to Charley Pride. Anticipating a possible controversy he refrained from recording it.

Lane then offered the song to his friend Willie Nelson. Nelson had recently a hit single with "The Party's Over", that peaked at twenty-four in Billboard's Hot Country Singles.  Nelson's version of "Blackjack County Chain" was released  with a cover of Floyd Tillman's "Some Other World" on the flipside. The single debuted in May 1967. RCA Records published a full-page advertising promoting the single on Billboard. On its review, the publication praised the work of producer Chet Atkins, while it declared "(Nelson's) moving rendition [...] should be working its way up to the top".

The song met instant success, reaching number twenty-four on the country singles chart. At the time the song's popularity was growing, most of the radio stations banned it from airplay due to its content. Nelson re-recorded the song as a duet with Waylon Jennings for their 1983 collaboration Take it to the Limit.

Chart performance

Cover versions

Studio versions
Irish folk singer Christy Moore covered "Blackjack County Chain" on the album Smoke and Strong Whiskey released in 1991. Bluegrass music performer Del McCoury covered the song (as "Blackjack County Chains") on the 1996 Del McCoury Band album The Cold Hard Facts. Charley Crockett is an American blues, country and Americana singer, guitarist, and songwriter who also covered the song, releasing his version in 2020 on his studio album Welcome to Hard Times.

Footnotes

References

1967 songs
1967 singles
Willie Nelson songs
Waylon Jennings songs
Songs written by Red Lane
Song recordings produced by Chet Atkins
RCA Victor singles